Major Henryk Dobrzański (22 June 1897 – 30 April 1940) was a Polish soldier, sportsman and partisan. He fought in the Polish Legions in World War I, Polish-Ukrainian War of 1918, the Polish-Bolshevik War of 1919-1921 and the Polish September Campaign of 1939. He is however best known as the leader of the partisan unit known as the Detached Unit of the Polish Army which operated in 1939 and early 1940 near Kielce.

Exploits of Dobrzański and his unit, considered the first partisans in Poland and arguably, of World War II, became a legend in Poland already during the war. Hubal has been described as Poland's last "Romantic Hero" and compared to figures such as Robin Hood, William Tell, Till Eulenspiegel and Davy Crockett.

Early life and career
Henryk Dobrzański was born on 22 June 1897 in Jasło, Austria-Hungary to a Polish noble family (Coat of arms of Leliwa), of Henryk Dobrzański de Hubal and Maria Dobrzańska née Lubieniecka. In 1912 he joined the "Drużyny Strzeleckie", a Polish pro-independence youth organisation. When World War I broke out he volunteered to join Józef Piłsudski's Polish Legions. He served with distinction in the 2nd Regiment of Uhlans and participated in many battles such as Stawczany and Battle of Rarańcza. In 1918 after Poland regained its independence he joined the Polish Army.

He took part in the Polish-Ukrainian War of 1918 and fought with his cavalry platoon during the Siege of Lwów. Later he participated in Polish-Bolshevik War of 1919-1921. For his bravery he was awarded the Virtuti Militari, the highest Polish military award, and four times the Krzyż Walecznych, in addition to many other military awards.

After the Peace of Riga he remained in the Polish Army. He became a member of the Polish equestrian team, winning many international competitions. He also took part in the 1928 Summer Olympics in Amsterdam and came fourth at the prestigious Aldershot competition. In his sports career he gained 22 gold, three silver and four bronze medals altogether.

World War II
Shortly before the 1939 Invasion of Poland he was assigned to the 110th Reserve Cavalry Regiment [pl] as a deputy commander. His unit was to enter combat as a second-line formation, but fast advances of the Wehrmacht made the completion of training impossible. On 11 September it was moved to Wołkowysk, from where it marched towards Grodno and Augustów Forest. It fought several skirmishes against the German army and after the Soviet invasion of Poland took part in the defense of the city against the Red Army.

After two days of heavy fighting against the numerically superior Soviets, on 20 September Grodno was lost and three days later gen. bryg. Wacław Przeździecki, the commander of the defense of the Grodno area, ordered all his troops to escape to neutral Lithuania. According to another account that order was given shortly after the Soviet invasion begun, around September 17 or 18. In either, case, the 110th Regiment did not obey this order. The unit joined with the remnants of several routed regiments and fought its way towards the capital Warsaw. It got surrounded by the Red Army in the Biebrza river area and suffered serious casualties, but managed to break through the enemy defenses. After that, Lieutenant Colonel Jerzy Dąbrowski, the commander of the regiment, decided his unit should disband. A group of approximately 180 men wanted to continue, and Dobrzański took command of them and led them towards Warsaw, which was under siege. He named his force the "Detached Unit of the Polish Army" (Oddział Wydzielony Wojska Polskiego), a term first recorded on September 24 when the unit was near the Woźnawieś village in the Podlasie region.

Warsaw capitulated on 27 September, before Dobrzański and his men were able to reach it. That left him faced with three choices: disband, evacuate (via Hungary or Romania) to France, or continue the fight. Approximately 50 men volunteered to continue the fight. He led his unit southwards to try to break out and reach France. On 1 October 1939 they crossed the Vistula near Łomża and started their march towards the Holy Cross Mountains. The next day his unit, previously avoiding engaging the German units, launched its first attack, when it successfully ambushed a bogged German convoy. After that he decided to stay in the Kielce area with his unit and wait until the Allied relief came, which he expected in the Spring of 1940. He also swore that he would not take off his uniform until after the war. On 6 October the Battle of Kock ended the resistance of the last major unit of the Polish Army. With the support of the local civilian population, Hubal and his men managed to evade the Germans for several months.

In March 1940 his unit inflicted heavy casualties on a number of German units in ambushes. Due to these reprisals local sentiment turned against Hubal's unit, and the newly formed ZWZ became concerned that this would inhibit their ability to recruit. The ZWZ and the Government Delegate's Office at Home ordered Hubal to disband his unit. He refused to do so.

Death and legacy
On 30 April 1940 his staff quarters, in a ravine near the village of Anielin (near Opoczno), were ambushed. In an unequal battle Dobrzański and one his men were killed. The Germans desecrated his body and put it on public view in the local villages. They then transported it to Tomaszów Mazowiecki and either burnt it or buried it in an unknown location. The remnants of the "Detached Unit of the Polish Army" continued the struggle until 25 June 1940, when it was disbanded. The exact place of Hubal's burial remains uncertain to this day, despite efforts to locate it.

Hubal and his unit have been a subject of a number of literary works, including Melchior Wańkowicz's Hubalczycy as early as 1946. Hubal has been described as Poland's last "Romantic Hero" and compared to figures such as Robin Hood, William Tell, Till Eulenspiegel and Davy Crockett..

In 1949 Dobrzański's son, Ludwik, emigrated to England and became a property developer. He died on 15 December 1990 in Bedford.

In 1966 Henryk Dobrzański was posthumously awarded the Golden Cross of the Virtuti Militari and promoted to Colonel. Currently almost 200 organisations and institutions bear his name, including 82 Scouting groups, 31 schools and several military units. There are streets named after him in almost every Polish city. 

In 1973 the film Hubal, based on his resistance campaign, was released.

The pseudonym "Hubal" comes from his family coat of arms.

Decorations
Military decorations awarded to Henyrk Dobrzański include:
 Order Virtuti Militari Golden Cross (posthumously in 1966)
 Order Virtuti Militari Silver Cross
 Cross of Independence
 Cross of Valour 4 times
 Medal Decade of regained Independence
 Commemorative Medal for War of 1918-1921

See also

 Polish contribution to World War II
 Polish Secret State
 List of guerrillas

References
Citations

Bibliography
 Mazower, Mark Hitler's Empire: Nazi Rule in Occupied Europe London, England, Penguine Books (2008).

Further reading
 Melchior Wankowicz: Hubalczycy, Warsaw, 1970;
 Marek Szymanski: Oddzial majora Hubala, Warszawa 1999, ;
 Aleksandra Ziolkowska-Boehm: Z miejsca na miejsce. W cieniu legendy Hubala, Warsaw 1986, ;
 Aleksandra Ziolkowska-Boehm: Kaja od Radoslawa, czyli historia Hubalowego krzyza, Warszawa 2006, ;
 Aleksandra Ziolkowska-Boehm: Dwor w Krasnicy i Hubalowy Demon, Warszawa 2009, PIW, ;
 Aleksandra Ziolkowska-Boehm: Lepszy dzien nie przyszedl juz, Warszawa 2012, Iskry, ;
 Aleksandra Ziolkowska-Boehm: Kaia, Heroine of the 1944 Warsaw Rising, Introduction: Bruce E. Johansen. Lanham, MD and Plymouth, UK: Lexington Books, 2012, .
 Aleksandra Ziolkowska-Boehm: Polish Hero Roman Rodziewicz: Fate of a Hubal Soldier in Auschwitz, Buchenwald, and Postwar England. Foreword by Matt DeLaMater. Lanham, MD and Plymouth, UK: Lexington Books, 2013, .
 Medical care in the unit of major Henryk Dobrzański aka "Hubal" D. Syryjczyk in Military Medicine and Pharmacy

1897 births
1940 deaths
People from Jasło
People from the Kingdom of Galicia and Lodomeria
Polish Austro-Hungarians
20th-century Polish nobility
Polish Army officers
Polish resistance members of World War II
Polish Rifle Squads members
Polish Scouts and Guides
Guerrillas
Recipients of the Gold Cross of the Virtuti Militari
Recipients of the Cross of Independence
Recipients of the Cross of Valour (Poland)
Polish military personnel killed in World War II